Dennis Roy Allen (June 10, 1940 – December 1, 1995) was an actor and comedian. He was a regular cast member on Rowan and Martin's Laugh-In, and appeared on Love American Style. He starred opposite Ruth Buzzi in Gene Kelly's production of ClownAround. He died of lung cancer at the age of 55.

Life and career
Born and raised in Raytown, Missouri, Allen earned a Bachelor and Master degrees from the Boston University College of Fine Arts. After completing his education, he moved to New York and began his career performing in an Off-Broadway music revue of material by Julius Monk in the Plaza 9 club at the Plaza Hotel. He spent next four years performing sketch comedy in New York clubs, and working as an actor in radio and television commercials.

In 1968, Allen was cast as Calvin Coolidge in William F. Brown and composer-lyricist Oscar Brand's musical How To Steal An Election. Earning rave reviews for his performance; he drew the attention of the producers of Rowan and Martin's Laugh-In and was invited to join the cast. From 1970 through 1973, he was a main cast member of Rowan and Martin's Laugh-In; there he was reunited with former ClownAround co-star Ruth Buzzi.

After the show ended, he returned to Missouri and resided in Kansas City. During this time he struggled with substance abuse. After receiving treatment, he recovered and worked for a time with a program that assisted boys who were emotionally disturbed.

Allen resumed his career as an actor in regional theatre in Kansas City and the surrounding region, often portraying comedic roles.

He died in Kansas City, Missouri of lung cancer at the age of 55.

References

External links
 
 

1940 births
1995 deaths
20th-century American comedians
20th-century American male actors
American male comedians
American male musical theatre actors
American sketch comedians
American television actors
Boston University College of Fine Arts alumni
People from Raytown, Missouri
People from Kansas City, Missouri
Deaths from lung cancer in Missouri